Three Japanese destroyers have been named Teruzuki:

 , an  launched in 1941 and sunk in 1942
 , an  launched in 1959 and stricken in 1993
 , an  launched in 2011

Japan Maritime Self-Defense Force ship names
Japanese Navy ship names